John Allan Boyd (21 November 1929 – 25 October 2019) was a Scottish footballer who represented Great Britain at the 1948 Summer Olympics. Boyd played as a winger in the Scottish Football League for Queen's Park, Aberdeen and East Fife between 1946 and 1959.

References

External links
John Allan Boyd, Dictionary of Scottish Architects
Allan Boyd at Olympedia

1929 births
2019 deaths
Aberdeen F.C. players
Sportspeople from Dumbarton
Footballers from West Dunbartonshire
Association football wingers
East Fife F.C. players
Footballers at the 1948 Summer Olympics
Olympic footballers of Great Britain
Queen's Park F.C. players
Scotland amateur international footballers
20th-century Scottish architects
Scottish Football League players
Scottish footballers